Richard Moss (1823 – 2 March 1905) was an English brewer and Conservative politician who sat in the House of Commons in two periods between 1880 and 1892.

Moss was the son of Richard Moss of the City of London. He was educated privately and was involved in brewing interests in London before becoming a brewer in Winchester. He was secretary and later chairman of the County Brewers' Society and took part in the amendment of the licensing laws in 1869 and 1872. He was one time master of the Worshipful Company of Scriveners.

At the 1880 general election Moss was elected Member of Parliament for Winchester. He held the seat until 1885. He regained the seat in a by-election in 1888 and held it until 1892.

Moss died at the age of 81.

Moss married Mary Jeffreys Snow, daughter of John Wright Snow of London in 1858. Their daughter Ada Mary Moss married Percy John Howard "HK" Prossor at St Peter's Church, Pimlico, on April 16, 1914.

References

External links
Appearances on C-SPAN

Lesley Richmond, Alison Turton The Brewing industry: a guide to historical records

1823 births
1905 deaths
UK MPs 1880–1885
UK MPs 1886–1892
English brewers
Conservative Party (UK) MPs for English constituencies
19th-century English businesspeople